The Monongahela Formation is a geologic formation in West Virginia, Pennsylvania, Ohio, and Maryland. It preserves fossils dating back to the Carboniferous and Permian periods.

See also

 List of fossiliferous stratigraphic units in West Virginia

References

Geologic groups of West Virginia